Brigadier General Ahmed Mohamed was the Vice Chief of Defence Force of the Maldives National Defence Force. He was appointed to this post on 4 March 2012. Brigadier General Ahmed Mohamed was born on 9 July 1964 in the island of Maroshi, Shaviyani Atoll.

Military career and training
After completion of secondary  school in 1983 at Majeedhiyya School, Mohamed enlisted in Maldives National Defence Force (MNDF) on 13 March 1984 as a Lance Corporal and was commissioned eight years later on 21 April 1992. He was promoted to the current rank of Brigadier General on 8 February 2009.

Mohamed is a graduate of the Command and Staff College, Quetta, Pakistan. He is a fellow of Asia Pacific Center for Security Studies (APCSS), Hawaii and an alumnus of Near East South Asia Center for Strategic Studies, Washington DC and Marshall European Center for Security Studies, Germany. He has also completed the Governance and Management of Defence Course held by the Royal Military College of Science, Cranfield University.

Commands held
Mohamed was appointed as the Vice  Chief of Defence Force on 4 March 2012. He had served as the Commander of MNDF Northern Area. The General has also held various other command and staff appointments including executive officer of MNDF headquarters, commanding officer of MNDF engineering service, commanding officer of supply unit, executive officer of Ministry of Defence and National Security, commanding officer of both regional headquarters S.Gan and L.Kadhdhoo, commanding officer of quick reaction force II, commanding officer of planning and research development wing, managing director of Sifainge Ekuveri Kunfuni (SEK) and president of MNDF sports and recreation club.

Military decorations

 Service Medal decorations

 The Presidential Medal
 The Distinguished Service Medal
 The Dedicated Service Medal
 The Defence Force Service Medal
 The 3 November Medal
 The Good Conduct Medal

Family
Mohamed is married to Selvia Hameed and has a daughter and a son.

References

Maldivian military personnel
Living people
1964 births
People from Malé